Malcolm Stewart Leonard (March 4, 1911 – November 11, 1962) was a lawyer and political figure in Nova Scotia, Canada. He represented Digby in the Nova Scotia House of Assembly from 1956 to 1960 as a Progressive Conservative member.

Early life and education
He was born in Paradise, Nova Scotia, the son of Robie Stewart Leonard and Ruby E. Darling. Leonard was educated at Acadia University and Dalhousie University.

Career
He was an unsuccessful candidate for a seat in the provincial assembly in 1953. He was named Minister of Education in the province's Executive Council in 1956.

Death
He died on November 11, 1962 in South Range, Nova Scotia, at the age of 51.

Personal life
In 1938, he married Lillian Watkins.

References 

 Canadian Parliamentary Guide, 1960, PG Normandin

External links 
 Three Generations of Leonard Graduates : Spring Convocation, 1960, Vaughan Memorial Library, Acadia University

1911 births
1962 deaths
Progressive Conservative Association of Nova Scotia MLAs
20th-century Canadian politicians